Vedasanthoor is a panchayat town in Dindigul district 
Located at   Indian state of Tamil Nadu.

Etymology
The name derived from the Vedan Sandhaiur. Vedan means hunter, Sandhai means the place of selling.

Vedasandur is suburban of Dindigul.
It is located on the banks of Kodaganar river, which is a major drinking water source for Dindigul corporation. NH 7 (Varanasi -Kanyakumari) Highway pass on the Vedasandur. State Highway 152 connecting Vadamadurai to oddanchatram and Palani.

Demographics
 India census, Vedasandur had a population of 14998. Males constitute 51% of the population and females 49%. Vedasandur has an average literacy rate of 75%, higher than the national average of 59.5%: male literacy is 81%, and female literacy is 70%. In Vedasandur, 17% of the population is under 6 years of age.

Many spinning mills around Vedasandur.

Vedasandur is well connected by public transportation from Salem, Erode, Dindigul, Oddanchatram, Madurai, Namakkal, Karur, Hosur, Bangalore.

Politics
Vedasandur assembly constituency is part of Karur (Lok Sabha constituency). The current MLA is Ganthirajan S

References

See also

Cities and towns in Dindigul district